Stit may refer to:
 Satit, an Egyptian goddess
 Shtit, a Bulgarian village

See also 
 
 Stitt, a surname